The Norton Knatchbull School is a grammar school with academy status for boys located in Ashford, Kent, England. Girls are accepted into the Sixth Form. As of 2017, the school serves more than one thousand pupils aged 11 to 18.

History

The school was founded in Ashford around 1630 as a free grammar school by its namesake who died in 1636, an uncle of Sir Norton Knatchbull. The school continued to be led and funded by Knatchbull's family due to a stipulation in his will in 1636. It was known simply as 'Ashford Grammar School' until the summer of 1973. The original school was based in the churchyard in the town centre, in the building known as Dr Wilks' Hall and which now houses the town's museum, but has moved several times. By the 20th century, it had moved to its present location on Hythe Road. The main building of the current school premises was built in the 1950s and has recently been renovated in 2015 as part of a major overhaul of the school's facilities. A number of additional buildings have been added to the site: the Brabourne Building in the early 1990s, the Mortimore Building in the early 2000s and the Fraser Building (Sports Hall) which was completed and opened in the mid-2000s. A new Digital Learning Centre is to be constructed on the site in order to facilitate an expected increase in the number of students attending the school as the surrounding area continues to grow. The Digital Learning Centre has since been completed in 2021.

It is one of two grammar schools in Ashford.

Notable alumni
 Alex Brooker, journalist and presenter
 William Cole, classical scholar
 Sir Ronald Cooke, Vice-Chancellor of the University of York from 1993 to 2002, and President of the Royal Geographical Society from 2000 to 2003
 David Crawford CMG, Ambassador to Bahrain (briefly) in 1981, and Ambassador to Qatar from 1974 to 1978
 Roger Dean, artist
 Josh Doyle, lead singer of the Dum Dums
 Bob Holness, presenter
 Phil Hubbard, University of Kent
 Gary Hume, artist
 Matthew King, composer
 Robert Kirby-Harris, Chief Executive of the Institute of Physics 2005-
 Prof Leonard Marsh OBE, Principal of Bishop Grosseteste College, Lincoln from 1974 to 1996, and Chairman of the National Association for Primary Education from 1981 to 1983
 Daniel Pearce, former bandmate of One True Voice
 Surgeon Vice-Admiral Anthony Revell CB, Surgeon General of the Ministry of Defence 1994

See also
 Highworth Grammar School for Girls
 Spelthorne College (former Ashford County Grammar School in Middlesex)

References

External links
 Norton Knatchbull School
 EduBase

Educational institutions established in the 1630s
Grammar schools in Kent
1630s establishments in England

Academies in Kent
Ashford, Kent